Candy stripe may refer to:

 Candy stripe fabric
 The Candystripes, nickname for Derry City F.C., an Irish football club based in the city of Derry
 Candystripe, a style of friendship bracelet
 Candy-stripe bamboo, a species within Himalayacalamus, a newly erected genus of mountain clumping bamboos
 Candy-stripe pistol prawn, a species within Alpheus, a genus of pistol shrimp

See also 
 Candy striper, a U.S. hospital volunteer, from the uniform they wear
 Candy Stripers (film), a 1978 pornographic film
 Candystriped allotropa, Allotropa virgata, an achlorophyllous plant in the heather family